Rob "Robbie" Cordemans (born October 31, 1974 in Schiedam) is a Dutch baseball player.  He bats and throws righthanded. Cordemans is best known for representing the Dutch national team at the Olympics and other international competitions.

He has pitched in 107 games in his career in the Dutch Major League through 2015, and had a record of 63-12 with an ERA of 1.00.

He attended Indian River State College, where he was the 1997 Florida Junior College pitcher of the year, but he was not drafted out of college. He is a finesse pitcher, and he throws a mid- to upper-80s fastball and an upper-70s changeup. He played for Team Netherlands in the 2019 European Baseball Championship, and competed for it at the Africa/Europe 2020 Olympic Qualification tournament, in Italy in September 2019.

Career

Olympics 
Cordemans has been a fixture on Dutch baseball teams in international competitions over a decade.  Most notably, he has competed in four consecutive Olympic Games for the Netherlands.

He began his Olympic career as a 21-year-old pitcher for the Netherlands at the 1996 Summer Olympics in Atlanta, Georgia.  Despite his lofty 6.94 ERA, Cordemans was the winning pitcher in both of the club's games during the preliminary round of the tournament.

At the 2000 Olympics in Sydney, Australia, Cordemans was 1-1 with a 2.51 ERA.

Cordemans participated in his third Olympic competition during the 2004 Summer Games in Athens, Greece.  His fourth appearance at the Olympic games would come during the 2008 Summer Games in Beijing, China.

Hoofdklasse 
His 14–2 win–loss record and 2.20 ERA led the league.

Although Cordemans moved to perennial powerhouse Neptunus for the  season, he was not able to replicate his success from 1999 and his record declined to 8–4. However, his 94 strikeouts placed him fourth in the league, and an 11-strikeout complete game win over the Italians helped Neptunus to a European Cup title.

In the  season, Cordemans went 10–2 with a 0.47 ERA and earned his second Pitcher of the Year award.

2007: Taiwan 
Cordemans' had a trial for the Uni-President Lions of Chinese Professional Baseball League in Taiwan for 2007. Cordemans was released on 28 May 2007 and went 3–4 with 4.5 ERA.

2009: World Baseball Classic 
Cordemans was selected once again to represent the Dutch national team at the 2009 World Baseball Classic.  During the first round of the tournament held at Hiram Bithorn Stadium in San Juan, Puerto Rico, Cordemans entered two separate games against the Dominican Republic in middle relief.

Cordemans pitched in three games, 6.2 innings pitched, 2 hits allowed, 4 walks, 3 strikeouts, 0.00 ERA.
2.2 IP, 2 H, 1BB, 1 SO in middle relief of 1st game vs. DR
2.0 IP, 0 H, 3BB, 0 SO in middle relief (6th, 6th) of 2nd game vs. DR
2.0 IP, 0 H, 0BB, 2 SO in middle relief (6th, 7th) of 1st game vs. Venezuela

Additional international career 
Cordemans was also named to the Dutch roster for the 1995 European Baseball Championship, 1999 European Baseball Championship, 2001 European Baseball Championship, 2003 European Baseball Championship, 2005 European Baseball Championship, 2006 World Baseball Classic, 2006 Intercontinental Cup, 2007 European Baseball Championship, 2010 European Baseball Championship, 2010 Intercontinental Cup, 2011 Baseball World Cup, 2013 World Baseball Classic, 2014 European Baseball Championship, 2015 World Port Tournament, 2015 WBSC Premier12, and the 2016 European Baseball Championship.

He played for Team Netherlands in the 2019 European Baseball Championship, at the Africa/Europe 2020 Olympic Qualification tournament in Italy in September 2019, and at the 2019 WBSC Premier12.

References

External links
  Dutch Olympic Committee

1974 births
2006 World Baseball Classic players
2009 World Baseball Classic players
2013 World Baseball Classic players
2015 WBSC Premier12 players
2016 European Baseball Championship players
2017 World Baseball Classic players
2019 European Baseball Championship players
Baseball players at the 1996 Summer Olympics
Baseball players at the 2000 Summer Olympics
Baseball players at the 2004 Summer Olympics
Baseball players at the 2008 Summer Olympics
Dutch baseball players
Dutch expatriate baseball players in Taiwan
Indian River State Pioneers baseball players
Living people
Olympic baseball players of the Netherlands
Sportspeople from Schiedam
Uni-President 7-Eleven Lions players
L&D Amsterdam Pirates players
DOOR Neptunus players